A Darling Range state by-election for the Western Australian Legislative Assembly seat of Darling Range was held on 23 June 2018 following the resignation of Barry Urban on 8 May.

Won by Labor for the first time in the seat's history at the landslide 2017 state election, the Liberals regained the seat.

Background
Following a large 19 percent two-party swing, Barry Urban was the first ever Labor candidate to be elected to the previously safe Liberal seat of Darling Range in the seat's 64 year history at the landslide state election in March 2017. In November 2017, Urban resigned from Labor and moved to the crossbench to sit as an independent, after questions were raised about his academic claims and his wearing an overseas police service medal he had not been awarded. Urban was referred to the procedures and privileges committee, which in May 2018 recommended his expulsion from the Legislative Assembly for contempt of parliament and misleading the House. Urban resigned immediately after the committee's report was released.

Labor originally selected Colleen Yates as its candidate for the by-election. However, on 24 May 2018, Yates announced that she would withdraw from the race, after reporters discovered that she had incorrectly claimed multiple university degrees which she had never obtained on her LinkedIn profile.

Candidates

Polling

Results

Ninety-two minutes after polling booths closed, the Australian Broadcasting Corporation's Antony Green called the by-election for the Liberals.

See also
List of Western Australian state by-elections
2018 Cottesloe state by-election

References

External links
2018 Darling Range By-election (Western Australian Electoral Commission)
2018 Darling Range by-election guide: Antony Green ABC
2018 Darling Range by-election guide: The Poll Bludger
2018 Darling Range by-election guide: The Tally Room

2018 elections in Australia
Western Australian state by-elections
June 2018 events in Australia
2010s in Perth, Western Australia